Klyuchi is a rural locality (a village) in Lobanovskoye Rural Settlement, Permsky District, Perm Krai, Russia. The population was 16 as of 2010. There are 5 streets.

Geography 
Klyuchi is located 29 km southeast of Perm (the district's administrative centre) by road. Koltsovo is the nearest rural locality.

References 

Rural localities in Permsky District